The Sound of Things is a 2016 Costa Rican drama film directed by Ariel Escalante. It was selected as the Costa Rican entry for the Best Foreign Language Film at the 90th Academy Awards, but it was not nominated.

Plot
A young nurse struggles after her cousin's suicide.

Cast
 Liliana Biamonte as Claudia
 Fernando Bolaños as Santiago
 Claudia Barrionuevo as Catalina

See also
 List of submissions to the 90th Academy Awards for Best Foreign Language Film
 List of Costa Rican submissions for the Academy Award for Best Foreign Language Film

References

External links
 

2016 films
2016 drama films
2010s Spanish-language films
Costa Rican drama films